The Junior Eurovision Song Contest 2020 was the 18th edition of the annual Junior Eurovision Song Contest, organised by Telewizja Polska (TVP) and the European Broadcasting Union (EBU). The contest took place on 29 November 2020, and was held in Warsaw, Poland, following the country's victory at the  contest with the song "Superhero" by Viki Gabor. This was the first time the contest was held in the same country for two consecutive years.

Twelve countries participated in the contest, having the smallest number of participants since the  contest (with some countries pointing the COVID-19 pandemic situation and travel restrictions as the reason of their withdrawal), with  participating for the first time.

France's Valentina was the winner of the contest with the song "J'imagine". This was France's first victory in the contest, as well as their first victory at a Eurovision event since Eurovision Young Dancers 1989.  and  finished in second and third place respectively for the second year in a row. The  and  completed the top five, with the Netherlands finishing fourth also for the second year in a row. Debuting country  finished last.

Location

The Junior Eurovision Song Contest 2020 took place in Studio 5 in the TVP Headquarters located in Warsaw, Poland, after the country won the 2019 edition on home soil in Gliwice with the song "Superhero" by Viki Gabor. However, due to the COVID-19 pandemic, for the first time, all the competing songs were performed in a studio in each participating country.

It was the third time Warsaw hosted a Eurovision event (after the Eurovision Young Musicians 1994 and the Eurovision Young Dancers 2005), and the first time the contest is held in the same country in two consecutive years.

Bidding phase and host city selection 

After Poland's victory in the  contest, the director-general of Polish broadcaster Telewizja Polska (TVP), Jacek Kurski, stated that the country would apply to host the event again in 2020. However, Kurski stated that the possibility of two consecutive editions of the event in Poland could be frowned upon by the EBU. After a period of uncertainty, in the last week of December 2019, it was reported by Gazeta Wyborcza that some Kraków City Councillors were expressing interest in taking the proposal that the contest be held in the city, focused on Tauron Arena. A few days later on 8 January 2020, the proposal was discussed at the City Council and accepted by the majority of its members. Poland was confirmed as the host country in March 2020. Then-incumbent winner, Viki Gabor, also expressed her desire for the event to be held in Kraków, her hometown.

Following the cancellation of the Eurovision Song Contest 2020 due to the COVID-19 pandemic, work on the event was suspended indefinitely. On 16 May 2020, during the airing of Eurovision: Europe Shine a Light, it was confirmed that the Junior Eurovision Song Contest 2020 would be held in a television studio inside the TVP headquarters in Warsaw on 29 November. Gabor also revealed the competition's logo and slogan during the broadcast.

On 7 October, Rafał Brzozowski revealed in an interview for TVP that the contest would take place in Studio 5 at the TVP Headquarters in Warsaw. In that TVP1 produced Jaka to melodia? since 2019. Previously, the venue organized the national finals (in 2003–04 as Krajowe Eliminacje and from 2006 to 2008 as Piosenka dla Europy) for the adult and children's (until 2004) versions of the contest.

Production 
The Junior Eurovision Song Contest 2020 was, like the previous year, produced by TVP and the EBU. In January 2020, the EBU announced that after the Eurovision Song Contest 2020, Martin Österdahl would become the new executive supervisor of both the Junior Eurovision Song Contest and the Eurovision Song Contest, succeeding Jon Ola Sand. Österdahl stated during a press conference that this year's event "faced more challenges than perhaps ever before", and that some worked double or triple the normal amount.

Format

Performances 

For the first time in the contest's history, most of the participants performed their songs remotely, recorded prior to the contest in a television studio in their country of origin. The EBU stated "to ensure continuity and the fairness of the competition, EBU Members in the [then] 13 participating countries have agreed to use a similar stage layout and technical set up to capture the performance of their artist(s)."

The opening ceremony and the interval acts were also broadcast live from Warsaw, with, according to the EBU, "all presenters and necessary crew socially distancing." There was a small audience present. During the interval acts, Viki Gabor performed two songs: her winning song "Superhero", and the 2019 adult Eurovision winning song "Arcade" with Roksana Węgiel and Duncan Laurence. Alicja Szemplińska performed "Empires", the intended Polish entry for the cancelled Eurovision Song Contest 2020. The show’s co-host, Ida Nowakowska, performed as a backup dancer for Szemplińska.

Voting 
The same voting system that was introduced in the  edition was used, where the results were determined by 50% online voting and 50% jury voting. Online voting consisted of two phases. The first phase of the online voting lasted from 27 November to one minute before the show starts on 29 November. The second phase of the online voting took place during the live show and started after the last performance and was open for 15 minutes. International viewers could vote for three countries. Viewers could also vote for their own country's song.

The other half of the points was determined by a national jury from every participating country. Due to pandemic-related restrictions, for the first time since the  contest, spokespersons gave out the points from each of the participating countries, and not from the venue.

For the first time in the history of the contest, the spokespersons announced their 12 points first, and then gave out their points from 1 to 10. This was due to the low amount of participating countries.

Presenters 

On 7 October 2020, it was announced that Ida Nowakowska, Rafał Brzozowski, and  would host the contest. Nowakowska was the first person to host either the junior or adult contest two times in a row. Brzozowski is a Polish singer and TV presenter, and later represented Poland in the Eurovision Song Contest 2021. Tomaszewska is a co-host of The Voice of Poland.

On 14 November 2020, journalist and TV host Mateusz Szymkowiak was confirmed as the host for the Opening Ceremony, which took place on the 23 November in Warsaw. Szymkowiak was the first person to host the Opening Ceremony of either the junior or adult contest two times in a row.

Visual design 
The theme for the contest, #MoveTheWorld!, was revealed on 16 May 2020, during the broadcast of Eurovision: Europe Shine a Light by Junior Eurovision 2019 winner Viki Gabor. The EBU explained:

The main stage in Warsaw was designed by Anna Brodnicka. It was "inspired by the rich symbolism of a circle and it’s  connection to our lives." The participating broadcasters were presented two versions of the stage to film their performances in their own countries. One version of the stage featured LED screens, while the other more simplified stage used projections instead.

The trophy was designed by Kjell Engman of the Swedish glass company Kosta Boda, using the same design as was first introduced in the 2017 contest. The main trophy is a glass microphone with coloured lines inside the upper part, which symbolize the flow of sound.

Postcards 
Each postcard took place in a different location in Poland. They all began with a short clip of the upcoming performer creating a heart with their hands or otherwise gesturing to the camera, followed by an extended sequence involving dance troupes dancing around cardboard models related to a certain profession. Each postcard ended with the upcoming performer giving a gift to a worker in that profession.

 Gdańsk
 Forest in Podkarpackie Voivodeship
 Moszna Castle
 Solina Dam
 Royal Castle, Warsaw
 Masuria
 Palace of the Kraków Bishops in Kielce
 Białowieża National Park
 Katowice
 Łódź
 Szczecin
 Centennial Hall, Wrocław

Participating countries 

Although initially confirmed as a participating country,  withdrew from the contest on 5 November 2020 due to the Second Nagorno-Karabakh War, reducing the number of participating countries to 12. This was the lowest number of participating countries since , which also had twelve participating countries.

Detailed voting results

12 points
Below is a summary of all 12 points received from each country's professional juries.

Spokespersons 
The following people announced the jury 12 points for their respective country:

 Olivia
 Saniya Zholzhaksynova
 Robin de Haas
 Darija Vračević
 Ksenia Galetskaya
 Marianna Józefina Piątkowska
 Marita Khvedelidze
 Leah Mifsud
 Mikella Abramova and Khryusha
 Melani García
 Sophia Ivanko
  Nathan Laface

Online voting
According to the EBU, a total of over 4.5 million valid votes were received during the voting windows.

Other countries 

For a country to be eligible for potential participation in the Junior Eurovision Song Contest, it needs to be an active member of the EBU.
 Albania did not appear on the list of participants published by the EBU on 8 September 2020. RTSH later revealed that they did not enter due to the situation caused by the COVID-19 pandemic.
 Initially, Armenia was on the list of participating countries as announced by the EBU on 8 September 2020. However, on 5 November 2020, Armenia withdrew from the contest, citing martial law imposed on the country as a result of the then-ongoing Second Nagorno-Karabakh War. On Instagram, Armenia's Head of Delegation David Tserunyan revealed that Maléna had been internally selected to represent Armenia this year. Her intended entry "Why" was released on 29 November 2020. Maléna was subsequently re-selected to represent Armenia in the 2021 edition, and later won the competition with the song "Qami Qami".
 In July 2020, the Australian national broadcaster SBS announced that they would not participate in the 2020 contest due to COVID-19 restrictions and concerns. However, they expressed their intention to return to the event in 2021.
 In December 2019, Bulgarian National Television stated that they had no plans to return to the contest at the time, as it was consolidating its participation in the adult contest. However, in July 2020, they stated that the broadcaster was looking to return to the contest in 2021 and had not completely ruled out the possibility of returning to the contest in 2020. Bulgaria did not appear on the list of participants published by the EBU on 8 September 2020.
 In June 2020, it was reported that Greek broadcaster ERT was seriously considering returning to the contest in 2020. However, weeks later, it was revealed that the broadcaster had decided not to return to the contest in 2020.
 In December 2019, the Icelandic Head of Delegation for the Eurovision Song Contest Felix Bergsson revealed that no decision had yet been made regarding a potential debut in the contest. Iceland did not appear on the list of participants published by the EBU on 8 September 2020.
 Despite having confirmed their participation in the contest in January 2020, TG4 announced in August 2020 that Ireland would not participate in the 2020 contest due to the situation caused by the COVID-19 pandemic.
 While Rai Gulp had previously stated in an Instagram story dated 4 November 2019 that they intended to participate in the 2020 contest; they stated in July 2020 that they had yet to make a decision on participation. Italy did not appear on the final list confirmed by the EBU on 8 September 2020. Later that month, the broadcaster stated that they had not decided yet on their participation, but no further statement on such was made and no Italian entry competed at the contest.
 In July 2020, Macedonian Radio Television announced that North Macedonia would not participate in the 2020 contest due to the situation caused by the COVID-19 pandemic.
 While Rádio e Televisão de Portugal (RTP) had provisionally confirmed their participation in the contest in August 2020, Portugal did not appear on the list of participants published by the EBU on 8 September 2020. RTP later revealed that they did not enter due to the situation caused by the COVID-19 pandemic.
 In June 2019, BBC Alba stated that talks had taken place that could enable its participation in 2020. However, in April 2020, the broadcaster announced that it had no plans to debut at the contest in 2020.
 In January 2020, Head of SVT Barn Safa Safiyari stated that Sveriges Television had no plans at the time to return to the contest, having concluded that it "does not fit the mix we want on our content". Nonetheless, the broadcaster did not rule out participation in the future.
 In April 2020, it was reported that Welsh broadcaster S4C and production company Rondo Media had stopped any decision on Junior Eurovision participation due to the situation caused by the ongoing COVID-19 pandemic. On 14 July 2020, it was confirmed that Wales would not participate in 2020 due to the pandemic.

Broadcasts

Official album

Junior Eurovision Song Contest Poland 2020 is a compilation album put together by the European Broadcasting Union, and was released by Universal Music Group on 13 November 2020. The album features all the songs from the 2020 contest. It is the first time since 2012 that the compilation will be released physically.

See also 
 Eurovision Song Contest 2020
 Eurovision Young Musicians 2020

References

External links 
 

 
2020
2020 song contests
2020 in Poland
Events in Warsaw
November 2020 events in Europe
Events affected by the COVID-19 pandemic
Impact of the COVID-19 pandemic on the music industry